A general election was held in the state of Alaska on November 6, 2018. Primary elections were held on August 21, 2018.

Federal offices

United States House of Representatives

State offices

Governor

State legislature

Alaska Senate

Alaska House of Representatives 

In the Alaska House of Representatives, a coalition of Democrats, independents, and defective Republicans control the chamber. Despite the Republicans gaining a majority of seats in these elections, the coalition retained their control when six Republicans joined the Democratic caucus.

Ballot measures

Measure 1

Notes

References

External links